Kayle Browning (born July 9, 1992 in Conway, Arkansas) is an American sport shooter. She participated at the 2018 ISSF World Shooting Championships, winning a medal. Browning was an alternate for the 2012 Olympics and is a silver medalist in the 2020 Olympics in trap shooting.

Browning is a graduate of Greenbrier High School and attended University of Central Arkansas.

Records

References

External links

Living people
1992 births
American female sport shooters
Trap and double trap shooters
People from Conway, Arkansas
Pan American Games medalists in shooting
Pan American Games silver medalists for the United States
Pan American Games bronze medalists for the United States
Shooters at the 2011 Pan American Games
Shooters at the 2015 Pan American Games
Medalists at the 2015 Pan American Games
Medalists at the 2011 Pan American Games
Shooters at the 2020 Summer Olympics
Medalists at the 2020 Summer Olympics
Olympic medalists in shooting
Olympic silver medalists for the United States in shooting
21st-century American women
20th-century American women